Behind a Mask is the debut English-language album by Russian alternative/punk rock band Louna. It was released on 30 April 2013, in North America on Red Decade Records. The disc is a compilation of the best tracks from the albums Let's Get Louder and The Time of X, translated from Russian to English.

Production
The song "Mama" was on the Chicago radio station, 95.1 WIIL Rock, playing Marija Will Rock's Show, and got airplay in the US iTunes chart along with the song "Business". The song "Up There" was filmed video clip.

Critical reception

Track listing

Personnel
Louna

References

External links
 Official album website

2013 albums
Louna albums